The 2018–19 Florida State Seminoles women's basketball team, variously Florida State or FSU, represents Florida State University during the 2018–19 NCAA Division I women's basketball season. Florida State competes in Division I of the National Collegiate Athletic Association (NCAA). The Seminoles are led by head coach Sue Semrau, in her twenty-second year, and play their home games at the Donald L. Tucker Center on the university's Tallahassee, Florida campus. They are members of the Atlantic Coast Conference.

The Seminoles finished  the season with a record of 24–9, going 10–6 in ACC play to finish in sixth place. Florida State reached the quarterfinals of the ACC tournament. The Seminoles received an at-large bid to the NCAA tournament as a fifth-seed, their seventh consecutive tournament appearance, where they reached the second round.

Previous season
For the 2017–18 season, the Seminoles finished with a record of 26–7, 12–4 in the ACC, to finish in third place.  Florida State was eliminated in the quarterfinals of the ACC tournament by Notre Dame. The Seminoles received an at-large bid to the NCAA tournament as a three-seed, their sixth consecutive tournament appearance, and were upset in the second round of the tournament by Buffalo.

Off-season

Recruiting Class

Source:

Roster

Rankings

Schedule and results

|-
!colspan=12 style="background:#; color:white;"| Exhibition

|-
!colspan=12 style="background:#; color:white;"| Non–Conference Regular season

|-
!colspan=12 style="background:#; color:white;"| ACC Regular season

|-
!colspan=12 style="background:#; color:white;"| ACC Women's Tournament

|-
!colspan=12 style="background:#; color:white;"| NCAA Women's Tournament

Awards
All-ACC
First Team
Kiah Gillespie
Freshman Team
Valencia Myers

References

External links
 

Florida State Seminoles women's basketball
Florida State
Florida State Seminoles women's basketball seasons
Florida State